Michael Maize (born Michael Meyer; December 1, 1974) is an American motion picture and television actor, perhaps best known for his role of Daniel in the film National Treasure: Book of Secrets.

Biography
Born and raised in Milwaukee, Wisconsin, Maize attended Pius XI High School, before receiving a Bachelor of Fine Arts in musical theater with a minor in communications and a minor in dance from Millikin University in Decatur, Illinois.  After graduating, he relocated to Los Angeles where he began to work in television commercials before launching his film and television career.

Career
Among Maize's television roles, the most memorable may be Donny opposite Anthony LaPaglia in Without a Trace; Jake Lydell opposite Gary Sinise in CSI: NY; and the Orderly opposite Jamie Foxx in The Jamie Foxx Show.  He also is conceivably noted for his portrayal as Artode in the vampire television drama Angel and Psycho Ranger Black, one of the Psycho Rangers, in Power Rangers in Space.

Besides making a name for himself in the television industry, Maize also has had prominent roles in major Hollywood films such as the previously mentioned National Treasure: Book of Secrets opposite Ed Harris, starring Nicolas Cage, Jon Voight and Helen Mirren; and Eagle Eye opposite Rosario Dawson, starring Shia LaBeouf.  Maize was also featured in the film More Dogs Than Bones, starring Whoopi Goldberg, and played William Herndon, Abraham Lincoln's former law partner, in the movie Saving Lincoln (2012), which tells the President's story through the eyes of Ward Hill Lamon, another former law partner of Lincoln's who was also his good friend and primary bodyguard during the Civil War. In 2018, Maize starred as Officer Nico in the first season of the Lifetime thriller series You.

Filmography

 The Jamie Foxx Show (1997) - Orderly
 Fame L.A. (1998) - Magician
 Power Rangers in Space (1998, TV Series) - Psycho Black / Photon
 The '60s (1999) - Leather Hat
 Power Rangers Lost Galaxy (1999, TV Series) - Psycho Black / Photon (voice)
 More Dogs Than Bones (2000) - Eugene
 King of the Korner (2000) - Bartender
 NCIS (2003) - Security Guard
 Angel (2003) - Artode
 It's All Relative (2004) - Wig Man
 ER (2004) - James
 Charmed (2005) - Zyke
 CSI: NY (2005) - Jake Lydell
 Numb3rs (2005) - Wallace 'Demento' Gordon
 The Valley of Light (2007) - Lean Man
 Raines (2007) - Dexter / Skeezy guy
 Final Approach  (2007) - Lyons
 National Treasure: Book of Secrets (2007) - Daniel
 Eagle Eye (2008) - Master Sergeant
 Gary's Walk (2009) - Rule
 Without a Trace (2009) - Donny
 Dark Blue (2009) - Coleman, crew member
 The Grind (2010) - Thorwald
 Youthful Journeys of the World (2011) - Ryan the Band's Manager
 No Ordinary Family (2011) - Ben
 The Casserole Club (2011) - Max Beedum
 Castle (2011) - Hank Roszell
 The Pyrex Glitch (2012) - Detective
 Grimm (2012) - Adrian Zayne
 Saving Lincoln (2012) - Billy Herndon
 True Blood (2013) - Smarmy Guard
 Kiss Me, Kill Me (2015) - Albert
 Mr. Robot (2016) - Lone Star
 Iron Fist (2017) - Dink 
 Gotham (2017) - Grady Harris
 Story of a Girl (2017) - Mr. North
 Happy! (2017-2019) - Le Dic
 You (2018) - Officer Nico
 Red Dead Redemption 2 (2018) - Skinners (voice)
Bottom of the 9th (2019) - Tommy

References

External links

1974 births
American male film actors
American male television actors
Living people
Male actors from Milwaukee
Male actors from Los Angeles
Millikin University alumni